Anta is a small village in Anta District, Carhuaz Province, Ancash Region, Peru. It is the district's capital, and lies 9.1 km to the north of the village of Quillo.

Transportation 
The village is home to the airport serving the regional capital of Huaraz, Huaraz Province, which is on the Santa River  to the southeast. Comandante FAP Germán Arias Graziani Airport is north of the village and has scheduled service from domestic carrier LC Perú to the international airport in Lima, the national capital. The airport was created by the U.S. Air Force in June 1970. The decision was made that the dirt road going through Anta would be the best bet for possible landings so Ssgt Eubanks and Sgt Holmes deployed to Anta and began work to convert that dirt road into a runway that would eventually become the Anta Airport.

After the May 31, 1970, earthquake, the 39th Tactical Airlift Squadron on rotational duty at Howard AFB, Canal Zone sent C-130's to Lima to support the relief efforts.  Upon arriving at Lima Colonel Beckett (the squadron commander), Ssgt Richard Eubanks and Sgt Leonard Holmes (both Combat Controllers), Mrs. Consuelo de Velasco (Peru's first lady) and US Ambassador Taylor Belcher flew over the disaster area to survey the damage and determine the best method to reach the area.

The 39th Tactical Airlift Squadron published this booklet about the mission;

https://photos.google.com/u/1/share/AF1QipNwWLfxDkpQfTATU1MOX_O8PohU2JpGUFp9bBe3IOVBwSSHAB2VPUNrDsyB6jxlzQ?key=UkNsX0F5anVOTl9nY3hPamtxM0RXanhSSFpCREJ3

References 

Populated places in the Ancash Region